Puttin' On the Ritz is a 1930 American pre-Code musical film directed by Edward Sloman and starring Harry Richman, Joan Bennett, and James Gleason. The screenplay was written by Gleason and William K. Wells based on a story by John W. Considine Jr. It was the first of many films to feature the popular song "Puttin' On the Ritz", which was written and published by Irving Berlin in 1929.

Cast 
Harry Richman as Harry Raymond 
Joan Bennett as Dolores Fenton 
James Gleason as James 'Jimmy' Tierney 
Aileen Pringle as Mrs. Teddy Von Rennsler 
Lilyan Tashman as Goldie Devere 
Purnell Pratt as George Barnes 
Richard Tucker as Fenway Brooks 
Eddie Kane as Bob Wagner 
George Irving as Dr. Blair 
Sidney Franklin as Schmidt

Preservation

All current prints derive from a 1940s re-release print that was censored for pre-Code content and cut down by about twenty minutes. The title cards at the start and end of the film have also been edited and altered. Puttin' On the Ritz was originally shot with two-color Technicolor sequences, but today those sequences partially survive only in black and white.

See also
List of early color feature films

External links 
 
 

1930 films
1930s musical drama films
1930s color films
American musical drama films
Films scored by Irving Berlin
Films directed by Edward Sloman
United Artists films
1930 drama films
1930s American films